Görwel Christina Carlsdotter Gyllenstierna (1646-1708) was a Swedish noblewoman duellist and landowner.

Görwel was the daughter of Lieutenant Colonel Carl Nilsson Gyllenstierna of Fågelvik and Hässelby (1621-1650) and Sidonia Mannersköld (1620-1656). 

She was famous among her contemporaries for her great learning as well as for her interest and skill in sports normally reserved for males. She was referred to as "A Minerva and an Amazon in one" and was a student of not only chemistry, theology, natural science and other subjects but also active within hunting, fencing and other "Knightly practises" rather than "feminine tasks", something which attracted a lot of attention. She made herself widely known when in 1661 she challenged Lieutenant Colonel David Kohl to a duel for marrying her cousin Görwel Nilsdotter Gyllenstierna against the consent of her family.

Görwel Christina married Lieutenant Colonel Leonard Schulman (1644-1677) in 1670. After his death, she managed his estate Leonardsbergs gård during the minority of her son.

References 
 Wilhelmina Stålberg: Anteckningar om svenska qvinnor (Notes on Swedish women) 
 http://www.gyllenstierna.org/pdf/attatavla.pdf
 Nordisk tidskrift för bok- och biblioteksväsen / Årgång VIII. 1921 /
 http://norrkopingprojekt.wordpress.com/historia/fran-forntid-och-medeltid-till-1900-tal-under-bearbetning/leonardsberg-hallristningar/
 

1646 births
1708 deaths
17th-century Swedish nobility
17th-century Swedish landowners
Female duellists
People of the Swedish Empire
Swedish duellists